Free Officers Movement can mean:
 Free Officers Movement (Egypt) in Egypt who overthrew the Muhammad Ali Dynasty in the Egyptian Revolution, to form the Republic of Egypt.
 Free Officers Movement (Iraq) in Iraq who overthrew the Hashemite Dynasty in the 14 July Revolution, to form the Republic of Iraq.
 Free Officers and Civilians Movement in Iraq who campaigned against Saddam Hussein's rule in the 1991 Iraqi uprisings, to form the Coalition Provisional Authority.
 Free Officers Movement (Syria) in Syria who fought against Bashar al-Assad's rule in the Syrian Civil War in 2011, to form the Free Syrian Army.
 Free Officers Movement (Libya) in Libya who overthrew the Senussi Dynasty in the Libyan Revolution, to form the Libyan Arab Republic.